OO9, often also denoted as 009 or 00-9 is a model railway scale and gauge combination of 4 mm scale and  gauge tracks, which models a prototype track gauge of . The  track gauge is used by N gauge model railways, a common commercial scale, which means that a selection of wheels, track, and mechanisms is readily available.

 gauge railways were common in Britain, but the gauge implied by 9mm at 4mm scale -  - was quite rare - today only the Talyllyn and Corris railways in the UK use this gauge. However at 4mm/ft scale, the differences to gauge required to correct this are barely perceptible by eye, and the wide use of 9mm gauge in the modelling community is generally accepted to be an appropriate compromise. For example, the correct gauge for a 2ft prototype would be 8mm, but such a difference of 1mm from the OO9 standard is usually treated as insignificant for most modellers.

The 009 Society exists to connect modellers, issues a monthly colour newsletter ("009 NEWS"), commissions its own range of kits, and provides a popular second hand resale service.

There is a growing range of commercially available ready to run support for OO9, with a number of manufacturers announcing ranges of products, and small manufacturers making limited runs of models from time to time. 

In November 2012, Peco announced the launch, during 2013, of a range of ready to run 009 coaches and wagons, based on prototypes of the Lynton and Barnstaple Railway. This was followed in the March 2013 edition of Railway Modeller Magazine, by Danish manufacturer Heljan announcing an 009 locomotive based on the Lynton and Barnstaple Railway Manning Wardle 2-6-2Ts. Peco have since released ready to run carriages for the Glyn Valley Tramway (GVT), Ffestiniog Railway slate waggons and other general stock such as V tipper and 4 wheel flat wagons.

In July 2014, Bachmann announced a range of ready to run 009 products, starting with a Baldwin Class 10-12-D locomotive and a number of wagons, primarily used by the British War Department during World War I.  To date a range of Baldwin liveries have been released including models representing prototypes from the WHR, Ashover, Snailbeach, GVT and War Department. These have been launched alongside a range of wagons and a 'might have been' fictional Lynton and Barnstaple Baldwin locomotive named 'Sid'. Further Bachmann models representing Quarry Hunslet locomotives, small industrial diesels alongside further coaches and wagons are expected to arrive in the next couple of years after announcements in Bachmann catalogues. In 2015 Bachmann also introduced an OO9 line (marketed as "HO Scale on N-gauge track") based on the Skarloey Railway from their Thomas and Friends line. As part of their Skarloey line, Bachmann has introduced Skarloey and Rheneas products based on the Talyllyn Railway's two Fletcher, Jennings & Co. locomotives (Talyllyn and Dolgoch respectively) along with a Peter Sam model based on the Talyllyn's Edward Thomas (locomotive). A 3rd party industry emerged to offer replacement parts to convert the Bachmann locomotives into their real world inspirations, and Bachmann has announced plans to release modified tooling for a more realistic Talyllyn.  

In late 2019 Peco announced a new joint venture with Japanese manufacturer Kato, together they plan to release models of the Ffestiniog Railway England and Double Fairlie locomotives. Peco are also planning to release Ffestiniog rolling stock including bug boxes, quarrymens coaches and larger bogie 'Bowsider' coaches.

The modeller can also choose from a wide range of plastic, white metal and etched brass kit manufacturers such as Dundas Models, Meridian Models, Mercian Models, GEM, Rodney Stenning, Worsley works, Narrow Planet, Nigel Lawton etc. Many of these companies attend narrow gauge focussed exhibitions - a diary of events is available to all on the OO9 society website (link below).

Some modellers also adapt models originally made for OO or utilise scratch building techniques. Many OO9 modellers also use H0e equipment, which although built for 3.5mm scale, not 4mm, is often close enough to work alongside OO9.

Standard H0e 'bemo' style loop couplings are most often used. A slimmer alternative also with a loop is the Greenwich coupling which is compatible with these standard couplings and can be magnetically operated. Some modellers use chopper couplings or repurpose couplers made originally for other scales such as DG couplings. MicroTrains or Kadee couplings intended for N gauge can also been used.

Related scales
Using N gauge 9 mm track to model narrow-gauge prototypes is also popular in HO scale model railways. In Europe, this is known as H0e while in the United States this is called HOn30 or HOn2.

 gauge lines (common in Ireland and the Isle of Man) are generally modelled in 4 mm scale but with  gauge track, which is known as OOn3.

Manufacturers
Nigel Lawton 009 – Industrial narrow-gauge rolling stock kits and micro motors.
Peco – 009 narrow-gauge style Track, Rolling Stock and accessories
Worsley Works – Rolling stock and loco 'scratch aid' kits
Bachmann Branchline – Locomotives, Rolling Stock and Buildings
Heljan – Locomotives
Fourdees – Locomotives

See also 
 009 Society UK 009 modelling society and publisher of the 009 NEWS newsletter.
 HOn30 gauge and HOe gauge narrow-gauge railways in HO scale on N (9 mm/0.65 in) gauge track in 1:87 scale ratio
 Rabbit warren layout

References

External links

 009 Society
 Narrow Gauge North

4 mm scale
30 inch railways and modelling
Narrow gauge railway modelling